Ali Galip Pasiner (Formerly known as Galip Pasha) was a Turkish Birindji Ferik and politician who was notable for his participation in World War I.

Biography
He graduated from Erzincan High School in 1885 and from the Military Academy in 1888. He joined the Action Army, which came to Constantinople after the March 31 Incident. On August 12, 1909, he was appointed to the General Directorate of Security, which was established to replace the Ministry of Security, which was abolished in June of the same year. In the same year, he made a study trip on the police affairs of European countries and formed the current basis of the police organization. During the abdication of Abdul Hamid II, he ensured his safety and security.

He was appointed as the Governor and Commander of the Hejaz on April 5, 1915. Upon the revolt of Sherif Hussein, he was captured by the British forces in the city of Taif after 105 days of resistance and remained prisoner in Egypt for three years.

He came to Ankara in 1920 and joined the Turkish War of Independence. He was appointed as the Governor of Konya on January 12, 1921. Although he was appointed as the ambassador to Bukhara in 1922, he could not go to this duty after the occupation of Bukhara by Soviet Russia. After the Great Offensive, he was appointed to the Chief of War of the Temporary Supreme Officer Court, which was established in Izmir. After the war, he was awarded the Red Stripe of the Turkish Medal of Independence for his achievements. He served as the Chief of War of the Erkan Court of the Ministry of National Defense established in Istanbul and the Second President of the Military Appeal Court. He retired on October 3, 1931 at his own request.

References

Bibliography
Pasiner, Ali Galip - P | Boyut Pedia

1868 births
1939 deaths
Ottoman Military Academy alumni
Ottoman Army generals
Ottoman Army officers
Turkish Army generals
Ottoman military personnel of the Balkan Wars
Ottoman military personnel of World War I
Turkish military personnel of the Turkish War of Independence
Recipients of the Medal of Independence with Red Ribbon (Turkey)